Frederick Peterson (March 1, 1859 – July 9, 1938) was an American neurologist and poet. Peterson was at the forefront of psychoanalysis in the United States, publishing one of the first articles of Freud and Jung's theories of Free Association in 1909.

Peterson was born in Faribault, Minnesota. After graduating from the University at Buffalo, he attended the Universities of Vienna, Zurich, Strassburg and Gőttingen. Upon his return to the United States, he became a professor at the University at Buffalo in 1882. For the following decade he practiced as a neurologist in New York City. He was involved in Harold P. Brown's 1888 anti-alternating current dog electrocution demonstrations at Columbia University during the war of the currents and later that year was appointed by the New York Medico-Legal Society to lead up a committee finalizing the method of electrical execution via the electric chair in that state. He spent 1893–1894 as a professor at the University of Vermont.  In 1900 he was appointed president of the New York State Commission on Lunacy. From 1903 until his retirement, he served as a professor of psychiatry at Columbia University. He was also a well known connoisseur and collector of Chinese paintings.

Peterson's major contributions to medical theory include editorial positions at:

The Journal of Nervous and Medical Diseases
The New York Medical Journal
Mental Diseases (9th ed. 1920)
A text-book of legal medicine and toxicology (1903–04) with Walter Stanley Haines Philadelphia and London, W. B. Saunders & company; second edition published as Legal medicine and toxicology by many specialists, edited by Frederick Peterson, Walter S. Haines, and Ralph W. Webster. Philadelphia : W.B. Saunders, 1923.

In addition to his numerous medical writings, Peterson was an accomplished poet publishing Poems and Swedish Translations in 1883, In the Shade of the Ygdrasil in 1893, and The Flutter of the Gold Leaf (1922)

Peterson's daughter Virgilia Peterson was a noted author, critic and host of the DuMont Network program The Author Meets The Critics. A grandson, Prince Nicolas Sapieha, was a well-known art and architecture photographer. The American television producer Ted Jessup is a great-great-grandson.

References

Encyclopaedia Americana
45th Annual Report of Craig Colony, New York State
Psychoanalytic Pioneers Franz Alexander, Samuel Eisenstein, Martin Grotjahn
 "http://www.thepeerage.com/p21902.htm

External links

 
 
 

1859 births
1938 deaths
American neurologists
19th-century American poets
American male poets
20th-century American poets
University at Buffalo alumni
19th-century American male writers
20th-century American male writers
University at Buffalo faculty